Écully is a commune in the Metropolis of Lyon in Auvergne-Rhône-Alpes region in eastern France just west of Lyon.

It is the location of the Paul Bocuse Institute, which is partially situated inside the Château du Vivier. It is also the location of many higher education institutions, including École de Management de Lyon and École centrale de Lyon. The city is also home to the French National Institute of Forensic Science. Écully is at 6 km of Lyon downtown.  It offers a privileged lifestyle in the countryside just a few minutes from the downtown of the second largest metropolitan area in France. It is also one of the most exclusive towns of Lyon. The city is served by the Transports en commun lyonnais (TCL). The botanist Antoine Cariot (1820–1883) was born in Écully.

Name

Écully was originally covered with a forest of oaks "Aesculus" in Latin, the name changed over the millennia into Esculiacus, Excolliacus, Escullieu, Escully, Ecuilly, and finally, Écully.

History 
The circumstances and date of foundation of the city are lost in the mists of time. The site has been settled by humans since the Stone Age, burial pits as well as several polished stone axes, pottery debris, and a hollowed out stone in the form of a basin or mortar were found in 1860 during excavations.

In the early days of the Roman Empire the development of the Roman colony and capital of Gaul Lugdunum (which later became the city of Lyon) required the construction of major roads leading to other cities in Gaul. Built by Marcus Vipsanius Agrippa (son-in-law, and lieutenant to the first Roman emperor Augustus) two of these roads pass through Écully. The Roman colony also needed a massive water supply. The aqueducts that brought it from the Mont d'Or and the Brevenne river, crossed Écully.

The name of the town appears for the first time in 980 AD in a document of a cartulary of the Savigny Abbey situated on the confines of Normandy and Brittany.

Écully benefited from the economic development of Lyon. Rich merchants, aldermen, and notables bought the land and built beautiful houses, attracted in particular by a favorable tax system, obtained in 1485 and confirmed by Henri IV in 1594: the exemption from the Taille direct land tax. Some of the city's oldest remaining families settled in the city during this time.

Population

Leading institutions of higher education
 École centrale de Lyon
 EMLYON Business School
 Centre national de la recherche scientifique
 Paul Bocuse Institute
 French National Forensic Institute

Health

Écully has four clinics: the Val d'Ouest, La Sauvegarde, Mon repos and Saint-Louis.

Sports

The city has a municipal swimming pool, several gyms, a bowling alley, a multipurpose room, a tennis court, a football and a rugby field.

Businesses

The city is the seat of Euronews TV and the Groupe SEB (the world leader in small appliance).

References

Communes of Lyon Metropolis
Lyonnais